Shahzada Mirza Muhammad Quaish Shikoh BAIG  (1820 – c. 1889) also known as Mirza Quaish Shikoh (Muhammed Baig) was a son of Mughal emperor Bahadur Shah II and Moti Bai.

After the Indian Mutiny 1857–58, He came to udaipur where the Maharana of Mewar granted him a small subsistence pension. After that he had a son named Shahzada Mirza Abdullah Baig, who married the daughter of chief Qazi (Islamic judge) of Amrabad province (Maryam Begum). They had a son, Mirza Muhammed Jaffer Baig who moved to Hyderabad State and his descendants still live in Hyderabad.

References

1820 births
1889 deaths
Mughal princes